Urszula Józefa Gacek (born 17 March 1963) is a Polish politician and a former member of the European Parliament, representing Civic Platform. Between 2014 and 2016 she was Consul General at the Consulate General of the Republic of Poland in New York City.

Early life
Gacek was born in Urmston, Lancashire, England, and studied at Oxford University. She then worked as a financial analyst and as an author of chemical and energy publications before entering politics.

Political life
Gacek served as a member of the Polish Senate for the Civic Platform party between 2005 and 2007. In 2007 she became a Member of the European Parliament and sat with her colleagues in the EPP-ED group, serving, amongst others, on the Committee on Civil Liberties, Justice and Home Affairs and the Delegation for Relations with the USA. From 3 February 2011 to 30 November 2014 she was the Permanent Representative of the Republic of Poland to the Council of Europe.

Between 2014 and 2016 she was Consul General at the Consulate General of the Republic of Poland in New York City.

She currently heads the Organization for Security and Co-operation in Europe's election observation mission to the United States.

References

External links
 
 Council of Europe 

1963 births
Alumni of the University of Oxford
Consuls-General of Poland
Living people
People from Urmston
Women members of the Senate of Poland
Members of the Senate of Poland 2005–2007
Civic Platform MEPs
Permanent Representatives of Poland to the Council of Europe
Polish women diplomats
Women MEPs for Poland
MEPs for Poland 2004–2009
Polish women ambassadors